Costain is a surname of English, Scottish and Manx origin. When originating in Scotland and northern Ireland the surname is an Anglicisation of the Gaelic Mac Austain, meaning "son of Austin". The English surname is a reduced form of Constant or Constantine.

People named Costain
Molly Costain Haycraft (1911-2005), Canadian, author
Albert Costain (1910—1987), British, politician
Richard Costain (1839–1902), British founder of the Costain construction business
Thomas B. Costain, (1885-1965), Canadian, journalist, author
Costain Nhemwa - a king of the modern age

References